VA-38 was an authorized Attack Squadron of the U.S. Navy, established on 1 March 1967 and disestablished on 1 October 1968.

The squadron’s administrative assignment was to Commander Fleet Air, Jacksonville. However, it appears VA-38 existed only on paper. The squadron was established while the A-7A Corsair II was being introduced to the fleet and may have been programmed to be a new A-7A attack squadron. However, according to the CNO publication Allowances and Location of Navy Aircraft, the squadron was not assigned aircraft. The only records on the squadron are the CNO messages establishing and disestablishing the unit.

See also
 Attack aircraft
 History of the United States Navy
 List of inactive United States Navy aircraft squadrons

References

Attack squadrons of the United States Navy
Wikipedia articles incorporating text from the Dictionary of American Naval Aviation Squadrons